Nurse writers are nurses, primarily registered nurses (RNs), who write for general audiences in the creative genres of poetry, fiction, and drama, as well as in creative non-fiction. The published work of the nurse writer is analogous to that of the physician writer, which may or may not deal explicitly with health topics but is informed by a professional experience of human vulnerability and acute observation. The following is a partial list of nurse writers, grouped by century and arranged chronologically by year of birth.

19th century 
Florence Nightingale (1820-1910)
Mary Livermore (1820-1905)
Emma Maria Pearson (1828-1893)
Katherine Prescott Wormeley (1830-1908)
Louisa May Alcott (1832-1888)
Frances Margaret Taylor (1832-1900)
Sarah Chauncey Woolsey (1835-1905)
Sarah Emma Edmonds (1841-1898)
Susie Taylor (1848-1912)

20th century 
Lillias Hamilton (1858-1925)
Helen Churchill Candee (1858-1949)
Lillian D. Wald (1867-1940)
Ellen Newbold LaMotte (1873-1961)
Mollie Skinner (1876-1955)
Mary Roberts Rinehart (1876-1958)
D. K. Broster (1877-1950)
Mary Borden (1886–1968)
Florence Farmborough (1887-1978)
Agatha Christie (1890-1976)
Nella Larsen (1891-1964)
Louise de Kiriline Lawrence (1894-1992)
Helen Dore Boylston (1895-1984)
Virginia Avenel Henderson (1897 - 1996)
Jane Arbor (1903-1994)
Mary Renault (1905-1983)
Betty Jeffrey (1908-2000)
Anne Baker (1914- )
Patricia St. John (1919-1993)
Charles Logan (1930- )
Grace Ogot (1934- )
Sharon Webb (1936-2010)
Abasse Ndione (1946- )
Elizabeth Berg (1948- )
Sue Monk Kidd (1948- )
Carol Gino (1941- )
Echo Heron
Elizabeth Norman
John Glenday (1952- )
Kathleen Pagana (1952- )
Helene Tursten (1954- )
Robin Oliveira (1954- )
Gisele Pineau (1956- )
Jo Brand (1957- )
Theodore Deppe
Anna Jansson (1958- )
Teresa Medeiros (1962- )

21st century 
Paul Genesse
 Cortney Davis (1945-)
Theresa Brown
 Josephine Ensign, FNP, MPH, DrPH.
 Dr. Scharmaine L. Baker, NP
 Wendy Brooks (1977-)

Further reading 

 Chinn, Peggy L. and Jean Watson, eds. Art and Aesthetics in Nursing. New York: National League for Nursing Press, 1994.
 Davis, Cortney, and Judy Schaefer, eds. Between the Heartbeats: Poetry and Prose by Nurses. Iowa City: University of Iowa Press, 1995.
 Davis, Cortney, and Judy Schaefer, eds. Intensive Care: More Poetry and Prose by Nurses. Iowa City: University of Iowa Press, 2003.
 Hallett, Christine E. Nurse Writers of the Great War. Manchester, UK: Manchester University Press, 2016.
 Schaefer, Judy, ed. The Poetry of Nursing: Poems and Commentaries of Leading Nurse-Poets. Kent, OH: Kent State University Press, 2006.

References

Nursing
Medical writers